The Jim Duggins Outstanding Mid-Career Novelists' Prize is an American literary award, presented to two writers, one male and one female, from the LGBT community to honour their body of work. First presented by the Saints and Sinners Literary Festival in 2007, the award became part of the Lambda Literary Awards program in 2011. Originally presented annually, since 2014 it has been presented once every three years.

It is the largest literary award in the United States which is available exclusively to LGBT writers; all other LGBT literary awards, including the rest of the Lambda Literary Awards program, are open to heterosexual writers who address LGBT themes in their work.

The award was endowed by writer and academic James Duggins.

Recipients

References

American literary awards
Lambda Literary Awards
English-language literary awards
Lists of LGBT-related award winners and nominees